Tom George is a British director of film and television.  He is known for his feature directorial debut See How They Run (2022), which was nominated for Outstanding British Film at the 76th British Academy Film Awards. 

He is also known for directing the comedy series This Country (2017–2020), for which he won a BAFTA Award.

Filmography

Television

Film

References

External links
 

Living people
British television directors
British film directors
BAFTA winners (people)
Year of birth missing (living people)